Henry Rines (June 9, 1872 in Orsa, Sweden – October 5, 1950) was a Minnesota Republican politician, Minnesota State Treasurer, and Speaker of the Minnesota House of Representatives. Rines, a newspaper publisher, emigrated as a child from Sweden. He was elected to the Minnesota House of Representatives in 1906. He served as speaker from 1913 to 1915, as a part of a faction of progressive Republicans. He was elected as State Treasurer in 1916, a position he held for two terms.

After leaving office, Rines served in a variety of capacities, working as the chair of the state commission of administration and finance, and serving on the state office building committee. He was elected again to the House in 1942, and served two terms. He died in 1950.

References

1872 births
1950 deaths
Republican Party members of the Minnesota House of Representatives
Speakers of the Minnesota House of Representatives
State treasurers of Minnesota
People from Mora, Minnesota